Kwai Tsing District Football Association is a Hong Kong football club which currently competes in the Hong Kong Second Division.

The club's home matches are played at Tsing Yi Northeast Park.

References

Football clubs in Hong Kong
Kwai Tsing District
Hong Kong First Division League